Ray Ednie (3 October 1927 – 14 March 1980) was  a former Australian rules footballer who played with Richmond in the Victorian Football League (VFL).

Notes

External links 		
		
		
		
		
		
		
		
1927 births		
1980 deaths		
Australian rules footballers from New South Wales
Richmond Football Club players